In botany, the phrase ordo naturalis, 'natural order', was once used for what today is a family. Its origins lie with Carl Linnaeus who used the phrase when he referred to natural groups of plants in his lesser-known work, particularly Philosophia Botanica. In his more famous works the Systema Naturae and the Species Plantarum, plants were arranged according to his artificial "Sexual system", and Linnaeus used the word  for an artificial unit. In those works, only genera and species (sometimes varieties) were "real" taxa.

Contemporary French works used the word  for these same taxa.

Some plant families retain the name they were given by pre-Linnaean authors, recognised by Linnaeus as "natural orders" (e.g. Palmae or Labiatae). Such names are known as descriptive family names.

References

Plant taxonomy